The Salerno metropolitan railway service is a commuter rail system operated by Trenitalia, serving the Italian city of Salerno. It is composed by a 5.66 km-long line with 6 stations, extending from the central station to the Arechi Stadium, and is commonly known as Metro Salerno.

History

Overview
The idea to build an urban railway serving Salerno started in the 1980s and, between 1996 and 2004, several institutions signed and renewed agreements for the allocation of funds. The works for the service, officially named "Metropolitan railway system of the Salerno conurbation", started in early 2000s, and the line opened on 4 November 2013. Between April and June 2014 the service was suspended, due to a lack of funds.

Planned extensions
Salerno Duomo-Via Vernieri station, opened in September 2002 on the Naples–Salerno line, was originally built as part of the western section (from Salerno station) of the line. The planned extension will end at a western terminal of Via Monti (or Centro Storico Alto), also located in Salerno.

A further extension, that will run eastbound from Arechi to Pontecagnano station and Salerno Airport, has been planned, with the stations of Fuorni-Zona Industriale, Scavata Case Rosse (both in Salerno), Pontecagnano and Pontecagnano Aeroporto.

Route
The line starts at Salerno station, an interchange hub with regional and long-distance trains, and runs eastbound along the Salerno–Reggio Calabria line with a parallel and electrified single track. The eastern terminus, Arechi, is located between the homonym stadium and the Ruggi Hospital. Due to its location in the quarter of San Leonardo, it is also known as San Leonardo-Stadio Arechi.

All the secondary stations have a single platform. The ones with two tracks, Torrione, Mercatello and Arechi, have an island platform.

Services
The service, operated by "Minuetto" DMU trains (ALe 501/ALe 502), starts at about 6:21 am and ends at about 23:12. The trains run, with some exceptions, each 30 minutes, for a total of 29 daily departures from each terminus (Salerno and Arechi).

The trains are classified as "Regional" and almost all the journeys are limited to the metro route. Some of them continue towards Mercato San Severino, on the Salerno–Mercato San Severino line, linking the metro with other Salerno's minor stations: Salerno Irno, Fratte and Fratte Villa Comunale.

Gallery

See also

S-train
Commuter rail
Rapid transit
Naples Metro

References

External links

 Metro Salerno official website
 Metro Salerno on salernotoday.it

Metropolitan railway service
Rapid transit in Italy
Regional rail in Italy
Railway lines opened in 2013